This is a list of mayors of Gander, Newfoundland and Labrador.

Mayors

References

Gander